Wilmer Lawson Allison Jr. (December 8, 1904 – April 20, 1977) was an American amateur tennis champion of the 1930s.  Allison's career was overshadowed by the arrival of Don Budge, although he was both a fine singles player and, along with his frequent partner, John Van Ryn, a great doubles player.
At the University of Texas at Austin, Allison was the Intercollegiate tennis champion in 1927. One of Allison's earliest tournament wins was the 1928 Canadian Championship, where he won the final over doubles partner Van Ryn 6–2, 6–4, 6–3.

Career
Right-handed, Allison's greatest triumph was winning the 1935 U.S. Championship singles, defeating Fred Perry in the semifinals and Sidney Wood in the finals, both in three sets. He had previously lost to Perry 8–6 in the fifth set in the 1934 finals. He was ranked U.S. No. 1 both years and World No. 4 in 1932 and again in 1935 by A. Wallis Myers of The Daily Telegraph. At the Wimbledon Championships his best results in singles came in 1930 when he finished runner-up to Bill Tilden, losing the final in straight sets. En route to the final he defeated reigning champion and first-seed Henri Cochet in straight sets in the quarterfinals. As a doubles player with partner John Van Ryn, Allison won the 1929 and 1930 Wimbledon and 1935 U.S. doubles championships.  Allison's last major tournament was a 1936 quarterfinal loss to Bunny Austin.

Davis Cup
Allison played a total of 44 matches, 29 in doubles with Van Ryn, in Davis Cup for the United States, the third most of any player behind John McEnroe and Vic Seixas. He won 32 of those matches but never the cup.

Playing style
In his 1979 autobiography, Jack Kramerdevotes a page to the best tennis strokes he had ever seen. He writes: "FOREHAND VOLLEY — Wilmer Allison of Texas, who won the 1935 Forest Hills, had the best I ever saw as a kid, and I've never seen anyone since hit one better. Budge Patty came closest, then Newcombe".

George Lott, who won five U.S. doubles titles as well as two at Wimbledon, wrote an article in the May 1973, issue of Tennis Magazine in which he ranked the great doubles teams and the great players. He called the team of Allison and Van Ryn the ninth best of all time.

Allison was a colonel in the United States Army Air Forces in World War II. He coached tennis for the varsity team of his alma mater from 1946 through 1972 and was head coach from 1957.

Allison was inducted into the International Tennis Hall of Fame in Newport, Rhode Island in 1963.

Grand Slam finals

Singles (1 titles, 2 runners-up)

Doubles (4 titles, 5 runners-up)

Mixed doubles (1 title, 1 runner-up)

References

External links
 
 
 
 

1904 births
1977 deaths
American male tennis players
United States Army Air Forces personnel of World War II
Burials at Oakwood Cemetery (Austin, Texas)
Grand Slam (tennis) champions in men's doubles
Grand Slam (tennis) champions in men's singles
Grand Slam (tennis) champions in mixed doubles
International Tennis Hall of Fame inductees
Tennis players from Austin, Texas
Sportspeople from San Antonio
Tennis people from Texas
Texas Longhorns men's tennis coaches

Texas Longhorns men's tennis players
United States Army Air Forces officers
United States National champions (tennis)
Wimbledon champions (pre-Open Era)
American tennis coaches